Soo M. Wong  (born ) is a former politician in Ontario, Canada. She was a Liberal member of the Legislative Assembly of Ontario from 2011 to 2018 who represented the riding of Scarborough—Agincourt in Toronto.

Background
Wong was born in Hong Kong and moved to Toronto with her family at the age of eight. She studied nursing and worked her early career in healthcare. Wong served two terms as a public school trustee with the Toronto District School Board. Before entering public office, Wong was a member of the City of Toronto Board of Health and a nursing professor at Humber College.

Politics
Wong ran in the 2011 provincial election as the Liberal candidate in Scarborough—Agincourt defeating Progressive Conservative candidate Liang Chen by 4,685 votes. She was re-elected in the 2014 provincial election defeating Chen again, this time by 5,201 votes. She was defeated by PC candidate Aris Babikian in the 2018 election.

She was a Parliamentary Assistant to the Minister of Community and Social Services and on April 5, 2016 she became Deputy Speaker of the Legislature.

Electoral record

References

External links

1962 births
21st-century Canadian politicians
21st-century Canadian women politicians
Living people
Hong Kong emigrants to Canada
Academic staff of Humber College
Naturalized citizens of Canada
Ontario Liberal Party MPPs
Politicians from Toronto
Toronto District School Board trustees
Women MPPs in Ontario